Symphyotrichum turbinellum (formerly Aster turbinellus), commonly called prairie aster in the United States and mauve-flowered starwort in the United Kingdom, is a species of flowering plant in the family Asteraceae native to the United States in Arkansas, Illinois, Iowa, Kansas, Louisiana, Missouri, Nebraska, and Oklahoma, primarily in the Ozarks. It has gained the Royal Horticultural Society's Award of Garden Merit.

Citations

References

turbinellum
Flora of the United States
Plants described in 1835
Taxa named by John Lindley